Trisha is an Indian actress and model, who primarily works in the South Indian film industries, where she has established herself as a leading actress. She won Miss Chennai beauty pageant in 1999 and later entered into films with the 1999 Tamil film Jodi. She is one of the most awarded actor in South Indian Cinema and is recipient of five  Filmfare Awards South , one Tamilnadu State award and one Nandhi award. She is also the only South Indian actress to be conferred by TAG Heuer with TAG Heuer Achievement Award for her accomplishment in South Indian Cinema and received it  from Priyanka Chopra. She is widely referred to as "South Queen" due to her popularity and body of work across all languages in South Indian Cinema.

Filmfare Awards

Stardust Awards

Zee Cine Awards

Asianet Film Awards

Asiavision Awards

CineMAA Awards

Edison Awards (Tamil)|Edison Awards

Filmfare Awards South

International Tamil Film Awards

Ananda Vikatan Cinema Awards

Norway Tamil Film Festival Awards

Nandi Awards

NDTV|NDTV Awards

Santosham Film Awards

South Indian International Movie Awards

Tamil Nadu State Film Awards

Vijay Awards

Behindwoods Gold Medal

References 

Lists of awards received by Indian actor